The Choral Public Domain Library (CPDL) is a sheet music archive which focuses on choral and vocal music in the public domain or otherwise freely available for printing and performing (such as via permission from the copyright holder).

It is a 501(c)(3), tax-deductible organization, whose contents are published under a specific copyright license, and editing articles can be allowed only for registered contributors.

Overview
The site CPDL.org was launched in December 1998 by Rafael Ornes. In 2005 CPDL was ported, or converted, to wiki format, and is known as ChoralWiki. In July 2008, Ornes stepped back from the site administration and turned the operational responsibilities to a group of the site administrators. A transition committee was formed which subsequently incorporated CPDL as a non-profit under California state law and now operates CPDL.

In addition to making sheet music scores available, the wiki format supports additional features including:
original texts, their sources and translations;
cross-indexing of choral music using criteria including musical genre, period, and number and voicing of choral parts;
composer information;
description and performance considerations can be included for works;
contents of collections of choral music;
community discussion such as through "Talk" pages related to composers or specific works.
advertising web banner for link exchange and for crowdfunding via credit card or PayPal.

Music is available for free download in a variety of formats, including score images in PDF, PS and TIFF format, sound files in MIDI and MP3 formats, and in the notation formats supported by various notation programs, including Finale, Sibelius, NoteWorthy Composer, Encore, and the open source GNU LilyPond. Most scores on CPDL are distributed under an open-source license. As of 1 December 2017, CPDL archives over 27,800 scores by more than 2,900 composers, contributed by over 1,200 editors and contributors. It includes large numbers of scores from the Renaissance and Baroque eras, including nearly complete vocal works by William Byrd and Tomás Luis de Victoria in excellent editions.

CPDL is suggested as a resource by departmental or faculty websites at Kent State University, Northern Illinois University, the University of Oregon, the University of Western Ontario, the Internet Public Library of the University of Michigan, the University at Albany, The State University of New York, by the UCLA Music Library, by the libraries at the Universities of Boston and Stanford and by inclusion by faculty members in syllabi for courses at the University of Wisconsin–Oshkosh. It is recommended by the Iowa and Massachusetts chapters of the American Choral Directors Association, and is included in the resource database of Intute, an association of Institutions in the UK.

Jason Sickel has described the CPDL as a Gold Mine for Choral Directors.

License terms 
Contents are published under a specific copyright license, if not otherwise specified and based on the GNU GPL license.

License is based on the principle that if users distribute copies of a musical work under the CPDL license, whether gratis or for a fee, they must give the recipients all the rights that they already have. Any modified Edition must be caused with the related date and any distributed copy must refer the copyright notice, whether gratis, or for a fee.

In that way, the same right of asking a fee may also be applied by the copyright holder, possibly with an exception for works listed in the U.S. public domain. As a copyright license, evenf if derived by GNU GPL, the license terms can be radically modified anytime, while they don't provide the universal and fundamental rights into a specific and permanent section of the license terms, that can be modified only under a very large agreement of the community, or not be modifiable at all.

From a more operative point of view, it underlines and implies that all the source code in any article can be viewed by anyone, copied, reproduced on different Wiki engines or long-time preserved on specific websites like the Internet Archive or archive.is.

See also
 List of online music databases
 Public domain resources
 Werner Icking Music Archive
 Mutopia Project
 Kantoreiarchiv
 International Music Score Library Project (IMSLP)

References

External links
 

American music websites
Choral music
Discipline-oriented digital libraries
Internet properties established in 1998
MediaWiki websites
Music libraries
Online music and lyrics databases
Public domain music
Charities based in California